The Berchtesgaden Hochthron is the highest peak of the Untersberg massif in the Berchtesgaden Alps in Berchtesgaden, Bavaria, Germany.

The summit of the Berchtesgaden Hochthron offers one of the best views of the Berchtesgaden region, because it has an unobstructed view over the Berchtesgaden valley as well as all nine massifs of the Berchtesgaden Alps, the Chiemgau Alps, the Austrian mountains of the Salzkammergut and the Tennengebirge.

Geography 

Climbing 

There are several marked trails that lead to the summit of the Berchtesgaden, and most of them are moderately strenuous hikes. It is also a popular destination for rock climbers. The Berchtesgaden Hochthron stops with massive, partly overhanging cliffs to the east and south. The numerous  climbing routes of the south wall are among the most popular and historically significant climbs of the Berchtesgaden Alps. The most difficult climbs are usually attempted in November on the "Old South Face" ( Level III +).

Galileo Test Environment 

Near the Stöhr house is one of the six base stations for the testing and development of the Galileo navigational satellites.

References 

Mountains of the Alps
Mountains of Bavaria
One-thousanders of Germany